Teng Boon Soon (born 30 August 1941) is a Malaysian politician. He was the Member of Parliament of Malaysia for the Tebrau constituency in Johor from 2004 to 2013. He sat in Parliament as a member of the Malaysian Chinese Association (MCA) party in the then-governing Barisan Nasional (BN) coalition.

Teng was elected to federal Parliament in the 2004 general elections, succeeding United Malays National Organisation (UMNO) member Mohd Ali Hassan in the seat of Tebrau. After the 2008 general election, he was appointed Deputy Minister for Unity, Culture, Arts and Heritage by Prime Minister Abdullah Badawi. His ministerial post came under threat in November 2008 after he was defeated for a position on the MCA's Central Committee, and he was subsequently left out of the ministry named by incoming Prime Minister Najib Razak in April 2009. His parliamentary career was also ended in 2013, when Khoo Soo Seang replaced him as the MCA's candidate and won the Tebrau seat in the 2013 general election.

Election results

Honours
  :
  Member of the Order of the Defender of the Realm (AMN) (1998)

References

Living people
1941 births
People from Johor
Members of the Dewan Rakyat
21st-century Malaysian politicians
Malaysian Chinese Association politicians
Malaysian politicians of Chinese descent
Members of the Order of the Defender of the Realm